Werner Schulz (22 June 1913 – 3 May 1947) was a German professional footballer.

References

External links 
 

1913 births
1947 deaths
Sportspeople from Swakopmund
Colonial people in German South West Africa
Association football midfielders
German footballers
Germany international footballers
SV Arminia Hannover players